Shebeke - are windows filled with coloured glass, created by Azerbaijani folk craftsmen from small wooden parts without glue and nails. 

The building of the Sheki Khans Palace, shebeke fills walls, window openings of halls and rooms. Geometrically, shebeke windows fit with the general composition of the main facade of the palace. The continuous stained-glass shebeke-windows of the central halls and side rooms overlook the facade of the palace. It is believed that the replacement of the outer walls of the halls of the both floors and the upper rooms by lifting sashes-stained-glass windows is a feature of this ceremonial pavilion architecture. 

Numerous residential stone houses of the 18th-19th centuries, decorated with shebeke, were also met in the city of Shusha.

Shebeke art 
It is an intangible cultural heritage that has an artistic constructive form in the Middle Eastern architecture and in the decorative arts and crafts. It has been used in the architecture of Azerbaijan since the 11th-12th centuries. A masterpiece of the decorative art is the flatness consisting of small glass pieces assembled by the master with wood elements that fix each other without glue or nails. The main "secret" of this art consists of the transfer of wooden parts with a ledge and an indentation between which small glass pieces are inserted. Parts of the tree are made from solid wood species - boxwood, walnut, beech, and oak. Shebeke patterns, meaning lattice, symbolize the Sun, the energy of life, the eternal flow of the time and the infinity of the universe.

Shebeke structure 
The surface dimensions of the shebeke can vary from a few square centimetres to several square meters, depending on the functional purpose of the items. Based on the connection with the architecture, the shebeke works of art can be classified in two directions: part of an architectural structure - a door, window, staircase; and individual interior items such as screen, lamp, chest, cabinet. Since the foundation of the ornament is made up of more precise geometric figures, there is another classification according to compositions: "jafari", "sekkiz", "onalty", "gullyabi", "shamsi", "gelu", and also "bendi-rumi".

Shebeke art in Azerbaijan 
The word “shebeke”, in translation from the Azerbaijani language, means “net”, “lattice”.

On the territory of Azerbaijan, shebeke as an art form was widespread in cities such as Sheki, Shusha, Ordubad, Baku, Ganja, Lankaran, Nakhichevan and Derbent (Russian Federation). The main center of Shebeke art is Sheki, where this tradition is still presented in its pure, classic form. Samples of this kind of art dated with 18th-19th centuries are concentrated here. A classic example of this art form is the Sheki Khans Palace (1762). 

Shebeke art and its symbolism differ to some extent throughout the regions of Azerbaijan. For example, from the point of view of the manufacturing technology, the Ordubad craftsmen preferred the simplicity of the geometric shapes and an ascetic colour scheme. However, despite this, in the almost all regions of the country, the coloured glass is the main material.

Masters of art 
Bearers of the art of shebeke and its symbols are folk masters. Famous folk craftsmen include Mekhti Mekhtiyev (19th century), Shahbuzla Abuzer Badalov (18th-19th centuries), Abbasgulu
Sheki (19th century). The revival of this art in the twentieth century was facilitated by Abdulhuseyn Babaev (1877-1961), Ashraf Rasulov (1928-1997).

At the moment, the development of art is promoted by Ashraf Rasulovs son Tofig (1961) and his grandson Ilgar (1990). Also, Soltan Ismailov and Huseyn Mustafazade (Sheki), Jabir Jabbarov (Ordubad), Rafik Allahverdiyev (Shusha) stand out in this area.

Restoration 
In the 1950s and 1960s. under the direction of Ashraf Rasulov, the Sheki Khans Palace was restored for the first time. In 2001, the window shebeke of the Juma and Ambaras mosques
(17th-18th centuries) in Ordubad were restored under the lead of the master Jabir Jabbarov. 

Huseyn Mustafazadeh, in 2002-2004, according to an agreement with the German company "Den Cmalcoh Ege MEK Gembelg GMB", participated in the restoration of the Palace of Sheki Khans. As a result, the doors and windows of the palace were restored, as well as most of the ceiling.

See also 
 Stained glass
 Culture of Azerbaijan

Gallery

References

Arts in Azerbaijan
Azerbaijani inventions
Architectural elements
Decorative arts
Glass art
Architecture in Azerbaijan